Montemayor is a surname. Notable persons with that name include:

 Carlos Montemayor (1947–2010), Mexican novelist, poet, essayist, literary critic, tenor, and political analyst
 Diego de Montemayor (1530–1610), Spanish conquistador, explorer, officer, and politician
 Felipe Montemayor (born 1928), Mexican footballer
 Jorge de Montemayor  ( 1520 – 1561), Portuguese novelist and poet
 Myriam Montemayor Cruz (born 1981), Mexican singer

Fictional characters
 Leandro Montemayor, president of the Philippines in the Philippine television series Kung Mawawala Ka